Rico Tampatty (born April 11, 1964) is an Indonesian actor. He is known for his numerous roles in soap operas. His name started to be known by public when he played in soap opera Intan, in which he roled as Fajar, father of Intan who is roled by Naysila Mirdad.

Career 
He performed in many soap operas at private TV stations. Admitted as an idol of the youth in the 1980s, his career as a model and big screen actor was more and less influenced by his hobby as an automotive fan and his obsession to buy a car with his own money, which eventually bring him into the world that increased the popularity of his name, first in the movies and then on TV series.

After finishing his study at the United States, Rico did not leave his career as an actor. In 2006, he and other Indonesian actors such as Adjie Pangestu and Atalarik Shah were involved in the making of an action movie. They joined several Malaysian stars in a movie launched in December 2006 titled "Mission: 1511". Rico then started to perform in soap operas, where he met the actress that used to be his partner in 1980s, Meriam Bellina. Among of the soap operas that reunited them are "Intan" and "Mutiara" produced by Sinemart and RCTI, which were daily aired.

Personal life 
Rico married a Malaysian woman named Laila Ibrahim. He has four children, two sons and two daughters. He likes sweet food and is a fan of Formula One. He left Indonesia long enough from 1987 to 1999 for studying business management in Hawaii Pacific University, Honolulu, Hawaii, United States. With his new knowledge, Rico now has a job as a business consultant.

Political activity 
In the 2009 Indonesian election, he tried to enter the politics by becoming a legislative candidate from the Patriot Party in the DKI III electoral area, which includes North Jakarta, West Jakarta, and Thousand Islands.

Filmography

Films 
 Wanita Sejati (FTV)
 Sorga Di Dunia Pintu Neraka 1983
 Tirai Malam Pengantin 1983
 Dia Yang Tercinta 1984
 Gawang Gawat 1984
 Pencuri cinta 1984
 Gejola Kawula Muda 1985
 Idola Remaja1985
 Madu dan Racun 1985
 Serpihan Mutiara Retak 1985
 Ketika Musim Tiba 1986
 Arini II 1988
 Sskia 1988
 Seputih Kasih Semerah Luka 1988
 Misi: 1511 2006

Soap operas 
 Aku Ingin Pulang"
 Jangan Ada dusta"
 Shakila"
 Kasmaran"
 Cintaku Di Kampus Biru
 Intan as Fajar
 Maafkan Daku Bila Mencintaimu
 Mutiara
 Diva
 Hingga Akhir Waktu
 Rindu
 Dewi
 Kejora Dan Bintang
 Kemilau Cinta Kamila
 Karunia
 Tukang Bubur Naik Haji
 Cinta 7 Susun
 Aisyah Putri The Series: Jilbab In Love
 Berkah Cinta 
 Anak Langit

Discography

Rico Tampatty's First Album - "Playboy" - with Ira Wibowo 
 Menanti
 Kembali
 Ku Cinta Kau
 Saskia Antara Cinta Dan Dusta
 Waktu Menunggu
 Saat Kusendiri
 Demi Kamu Hanya Kamu
 Wajah Dunia
 Maafkan Dirimu

Other albums 
 1986 - Album pergelaran Swara Mahardhika Guruh Soekarnoputra "Gilang Indonesia Gemilang" sings a song "Langkah Kembara"

References

External links 
 Mereka Ingin Pulang ke Indonesia... Kompas.com, June 6, 2008. accessed on July 13, 2013.

Living people
1964 births
People from Biak
Indonesian male actors
Indonesian male television actors